Zajíčkov is a municipality and village in Pelhřimov District in the Vysočina Region of the Czech Republic. It has about 200 inhabitants.

Administrative parts
The village of Rovná is an administrative part of Zajíčkov.

References

Villages in Pelhřimov District